Narciso G. Reyes (2 February 1914 – 7 May 1996) was a Filipino diplomat who served as the fourth secretary-general of ASEAN between 1980 and 1982 and the chairman of UNICEF between 1972 and 1974.

Career

He initially worked as a teacher, journalist and newspaper publisher. In 1948 he joined the civil service and was posted to the Permanent Mission to the United Nations in New York in 1954. He then became Director of the Philippine Information Agency. He was then posted to Thailand and was Ambassador in Burma from 1958 to 1962. In 1962 he became Ambassador in Indonesia. From 1966 to 1970 he served as Ambassador to the United Kingdom. Reyes then became the Permanent Representative to the United Nations in New York. He was Chairman of UNICEF from 1972 to 1974 and President of the United Nations Development Programme (UNDP) 1974. From 1977 to 1982 he was Ambassador to the People's Republic of China. He was Secretary-General of the Association of Southeast Asian Nations from 1980 to 1982.

On July 11, 1994, he was awarded the highest decoration in the Philippine Foreign Service, the Gawad Mabini Award, with the rank of Dakilang Kamanong.

References

Chairmen and Presidents of UNICEF
1914 births
1996 deaths
Filipino diplomats
Ambassadors of the Philippines to the United Kingdom
People from Tondo, Manila
Filipino officials of the United Nations
Permanent Representatives of the Philippines to the United Nations